William Bowler (early 1803 – 6 May 1863) was a New Zealand businessman and politician. In 1857 he became a Wellington Provincial Councillor, holding that position until 1861.

Early life
Bowler was born in England, and moved to New Zealand in 1851, having been involved in the New Zealand Company for a decade.

Death
Bowler died on 6 May 1863 at his home on Hawkestone Street, Wellington after a long disease. He was 60 years old.

References

19th-century New Zealand politicians
Members of the Wellington Provincial Council
New Zealand businesspeople
1803 births
1863 deaths
19th-century New Zealand businesspeople
New Zealand merchants